Christine Errath (later Trettin then Stüber, born 29 December 1956) is a German former figure skater who represented East Germany in competition. She is the 1976 Olympic bronze medalist, the 1974 World champion, and a three-time European champion.

Career 
Coached by Inge Wischnewski, Errath trained at SC Dynamo Berlin and competed for East Germany.

Being especially strong in free skating, Errath benefited from the reduction in value of compulsory figures introduced in 1972. She became World champion in 1974 and a three-time European champion between 1973 and 1975.

Until 1973, Errath's chief rival was Sonja Morgenstern, an East German coached by Jutta Müller. In 1976, her main rival was Anett Pötzsch, also coached by Müller. Errath took bronze at the 1976 European Championships and at the 1976 Winter Olympics. She retired after winning the silver medal at the 1976 World Championships.

Personal life 
Errath was formerly married to Ulrich Trettin, a former East German tennis champion, with whom she has two children, Jenny and Marcus. In 2006, she remarried, to orthodontist Paul Stüber, and is now known as Christine Stüber-Errath.

Errath currently works for the German TV station MDR, which produces programs in the German states of Saxony, Thuringia, and Saxony-Anhalt. She hosts the show "Außenseiter Spitzenreiter" (“Top model Outsider”) with Hans-Joachim Wolfram (creator of the Dynamo Dresden hymn "Dynamo Fever"). In 2010, she published her book Die Pirouettenkönigin (Pirouette Queen).

Results

References

1956 births
Living people
German female single skaters
Figure skaters from Berlin
People from East Berlin
Figure skaters at the 1976 Winter Olympics
Figure skaters at the 1972 Winter Olympics
Olympic figure skaters of East Germany
Olympic bronze medalists for East Germany
Olympic medalists in figure skating
World Figure Skating Championships medalists
European Figure Skating Championships medalists
Medalists at the 1976 Winter Olympics
20th-century German women
East German figure skaters
East German sportswomen